The 2008 season is the 54th season of Pakistan domestic football and the 5th season of the Pakistan Premier League, and was held from July 22, 2008 to December 6, 2008 under the auspices of Pakistan Football Federation (PFF).

Promotion and relegation
Teams promoted from 2007–08 Football Federation League
 Pak Elektron
 Pakistan Steel

Teams relegated from 2008–09 Football Federation League
 Pakistan Railways
 Wohaib

Teams

Stadia and locations

Format

Teams play each other on a home and away basis

The winners will represent Pakistan at the 2009 AFC President's Cup. The bottom two teams will be relegated to the Pakistan Football Federation League. Two teams will be promoted to the PPL.

The matches will be held at 1:00 and 3:00 pm respectively on home and away basis. This time the winning bonus will be Rs 500,000, the runners-up team will receive Rs 300,000 while the third position holder will receive Rs 100,000. All matches are likely to be supervised by neutral referees.

The 2008 season
KPT F.C. lead from the start and up to the midway point remained ahead of KRL, WAPDA and Army, who all made slips up. However, by the final third of the season KPT began to falter, and towards the end of the season it became a three horse race between Army, WAPDA and KRL, just as it has done the past four seasons. The season ended with WAPDA holding on to the title with Army in second over perennial third placers KRL. Pakistan Steel and PTV were both relegated.

WAPDA were given Rs500,000 as champions of Pakistan, while Pakistan Amy and KRL picked up Rs300,000 and Rs200,000 respectively. The Fair Play trophy along with Rs100,000 went to Afghan Club. Player of the season and Rs100,000 went to KRL F.C. defender Samar Ishaq. His teammate Mohammad Rasool was top scorers and received Rs50,000. While Abdul Aziz of WAPDA was goalkeeper of the season and was given Rs50,000. Ali Nawaz Baloch was best match commissioner and Mohammad Rauf Bari was best referee and each took Rs50,000

League table

Season statistics

Scoring
Fastest goal in a match: 48 seconds 
Imran Niazi for WAPDA against KESC (9 November 2009)
Muhammad Akram for Pakistan Steel against HBL (24 July 2009)

Widest winning margin: 6 goals
Pak Elektron 0–6 Habib Bank (23 November 2008).

Most goals scored by losing team: 4 goals
National Bank 5–4 Pakistan Airlines (8 October 2008).

Top scorer

Hat-tricks

Awards

Teams & players

Referee

References

External links
 Pakistan Football Federation

Pakistan Premier League seasons
1
Pakistan